The following is a listing of the documentation available for the former Barbers Point Naval Air Station on the Hawaiian island of Oahu, through the public-domain Historic American Buildings Survey (HABS). See separate lists for Pearl Harbor Naval Base, Hickam Air Force Base and Schofield Barracks.

HABS surveys

Historic American Buildings Survey in Hawaii